The  Bavarian Class PtzL 3/4 engines with the Royal Bavarian State Railways (Königlich Bayerische Staats-Eisenbahnen) were rack railway locomotives whose cogwheel drive was designed for working on tracks with a Strub rack. In 1923 they were incorporated by the Deutsche Reichsbahn as DRG Class 97.1 (Baureihe 97.1) in their numbering plan. The locomotives remained on their regular route between Erlau and Wegscheid until the closure of this rack railway in 1963. The last journey was on 5 January 1963. They were scrapped in April 1964 at Simbach am Inn.

See also 
 Royal Bavarian State Railways
 List of Bavarian locomotives and railbuses

References

0-6-2T locomotives
PtzL 3 4
Standard gauge locomotives of Germany
Krauss locomotives
Railway locomotives introduced in 1912
Rack and cog driven locomotives

Freight locomotives